}}

Richard L. Evans
June 1930 – October 1971

Alan Jensen
November 1971 – February 1972

J. Spencer Kinard
February 1972 – October 1990

Lloyd D. Newell
November 1990–present

American Christian radio programs
American music radio programs
Music and the Spoken Word Broadcasts list
American music television series